Cenni is an Italian surname. Notable people with this surname include:

 Giovanni Cenni (1881–1957), Italian chess master
 Giuseppe Cenni (1915–1943), Italian aviator
 Maurizio Cenni (born 1955), Italian politician
 Quinto Cenni (1845–1917), Italian illustrator
 Roberto Cenni (born 1972), Italian politician
 Susanna Cenni (born 1963), Italian politician
 Valentina Cenni (born 1982), Italian artist and actress